Mike Keeler (born May 21, 1950) is a Canadian former professional ice hockey defenceman.  He was drafted by the Buffalo Sabres of the National Hockey League in the sixth round, 71st overall, of the 1970 NHL Entry Draft; however, he never played in that league. He played two games in the World Hockey Association with the New England Whalers in the 1973–74 season.

Career statistics

External links

1950 births
Buffalo Sabres draft picks
Canadian ice hockey defencemen
Charlotte Checkers (EHL) players
Charlotte Checkers (SHL) players
Cincinnati Swords players
Hampton Aces players
Jacksonville Barons players
Living people
Mohawk Valley Comets (NAHL) players
New England Whalers players
Niagara Falls Flyers players
Portland Buckaroos players
San Diego Mariners (PHL) players
Springfield Kings players
Tucson Rustlers players